Khalid Yahya Rushaka (born April 26, 1980) was the first Tanzanian to participate in the Olympics as a swimmer. His countrymen know Rushaka as the "Tanzanian Dolphin," for his legendary abilities in the water. "The remarkable story of how he learnt to swim and rose to fame is legendary. His father, Yahya Rushaka, was one of the sole survivors of the Mv Bukoba ferry disaster on Lake Victoria in 1996 that claimed a thousand lives. It was his father who encouraged Khalid to learn to swim from the stories he used to tell of the brave men who saved many lives because they could swim. His father inspired him to pursue a career in swimming. Rushaka coached himself with the help of youtube videos. He progressed quickly through the ranks and the Tanzianian Olympic Committee chose him to represent the nation.  He specialized in sprint freestyle events. Rushaka represented Tanzania at the 2008 Summer Olympics in Beijing, where he competed for the men's 50 m freestyle. He finished third in the third heat by forty-five hundredths of a second (0.45) ahead of 13-year-old Seychellois swimmer Dwayne Didon, with a time of 28.50 seconds. Rushaka, however, failed to advance into the semi-finals by 6.37 seconds.

In 2016, ISR (International Sports Relations) Academy awarded Rushaka with a scholarship to study sports management in Busan, South Korea. The ISR Academy was the brainchild of the Olympic champion and IOC member Mood Dae Sung. He created the Organization to offer "free academic training to retiring or recently retired Olympians who are interested in furthering their careers in the field of international sports business and administration." Rushaka entered the second class of ISR under the directorship of Adam Pengilly, ex-Olympian and a member of the IOC. Rushaka was classmates with Ukrainian middle-distance star Olha Zavhorodnya, Estonian archer Siret Luik, South African wrestler Mpho "Queen of the Ring" Madi, and Brazilian bobsledder Fabiana Dos Santos.

Since returning to Tanzania, Rushaka has committed himself to building Tanzania's Olympic swimming program. He coaches promising Tanzanians at the International School of Moshi Arusha Campus. He also started Arusha Swim Club with the aim of accommodating more upcoming Tanzanians who didn't have the opportunity to study in International Schools where swimming is taken as part of the school curriculum. He is also the Founder and CEO of Sports Network Tanzania.

References

External links
NBC Olympics Profile

Tanzanian male freestyle swimmers
Living people
Olympic swimmers of Tanzania
Swimmers at the 2008 Summer Olympics
1980 births